Victoria Thorson (born January 13, 1943) is a New York-based sculptor, editor and art historian. She is most known for being one of the world's leading authenticators of French Sculptor Auguste Rodin's drawings, and, along with Kirk Varnedoe, was one of the first to discover fake Rodin drawings in numerous major private and public collections.

Thorson is the daughter of painter Ruth Rogers-Altmann, and the granddaughter of architect Arnold Karplus.

In 1975 Thorson wrote Rodin Graphics: A Catalogue Raisonne of Drypoints and Book Illustrations, the catalogue raisonné for Rodin, making it the accepted reference book for all known prints of the renowned sculptor.

Thorson's Oculus Sculpture was acquired by The Octagon (Roosevelt Island) in 2006 and remains there on permanent display, and her sculptural artwork BassWood Bodies is on view at the Garrison Art Center in Garrison, New York in Fall, 2018.

Sculpting Technique

Thorson’s sculptures tread a line between recognizable form and pure abstraction. In her artist statement for the exhibition at Garrison Art Center 2018 Thorson says she “has been seduced by basswood. Its softness of touch, when smooth, evokes the human body.” Starting with lumber or recycled wood, Thorson sees potential shapes and feels her way along the cracks, knots, and grain, following the lines of energy. She carves and refines to create slits of light between masses, and discovers abstract forms “to express life’s silences and vibrations.” Her work is often anchored by repurposing industrial metal that is the right weight, proportion, and aesthetic to be part of the piece.

References

1943 births
American artists
Living people